Another Chance is a 1989 film co-written and directed by Jesse Vint and starring Bruce Greenwood and Vanessa Angel.

Premise
A womanizing soap opera star John Ripley meets the beautiful Jackie. She is a client of his agent and best friend Russ Wilder. After enjoying a great relationship with her, he cheats and then realizes that he hits rock bottom.  He then tries to get back what he lost.

Principal cast

References

External links 

1989 films
American comedy-drama films
1980s English-language films
Films set in Miami
Films shot in Florida
1989 comedy-drama films
1980s American films